Andrey Yanuaryevich Vyshinsky ( – 22 November 1954) was a Soviet politician, jurist and diplomat.

He is known as a state prosecutor of Joseph Stalin's Moscow Trials and in the Nuremberg trials. He was the Soviet Foreign Minister from 1949 to 1953, after having served as Deputy Foreign Minister under Vyacheslav Molotov since 1940. He also headed the Institute of State and Law in the Academy of Sciences of the Soviet Union.

Biography

Early life
Vyshinsky was born in Odessa into a  Polish  Catholic family which later moved to Baku. Early biographies portray his father, Yanuary Vyshinsky (Januarius Wyszyński), as a "well-prospering" "experienced inspector" (Russian: Ревизор); while later, undocumented, Stalin-era biographies such as that in the Great Soviet Encyclopedia make him a pharmaceutical chemist. A talented student, Andrei Vyshinsky married Kara Mikhailova and became interested in revolutionary ideas. He began attending the  Kyiv University in 1901, but was expelled in 1902 for participating in revolutionary activities.

Vyshinsky returned to Baku, became a member of the Menshevik faction of the Russian Social Democratic Labour Party in 1903 and took an active part in the 1905 Russian Revolution. Here he first met Stalin: a fellow-inmate with whom he engaged in ideological disputes. After his release, he returned home to Baku for the birth of his daughter Zinaida in 1909. Soon thereafter, he returned to  Kyiv University and did quite well, graduating in 1913. He was even considered for a professorship, but his political past caught up with him, and he was forced to return to Baku.
Determined to practise law, he tried Moscow, where he became a successful lawyer, remained an active Menshevik, gave many passionate and incendiary speeches, and became involved in city government.

Russian Civil War
In 1917, as a minor official, he undersigned an order to arrest Vladimir Lenin, according to the decision of the Russian Provisional Government, but the October Revolution quickly intervened, and the offices which had ordered the arrest were dissolved. In 1917, he became reacquainted with Stalin, who had become an important Bolshevik leader. Consequently, he joined the staff of the People's Commissariat of Food, which was responsible for Moscow's food supplies, and with the help of Stalin, Alexei Rykov, and Lev Kamenev, he began to rise in influence and prestige. In 1920, after the defeat of the Whites under Denikin, and the end of the Russian Civil War, he joined the Bolsheviks.

Bolsheviks in power

Becoming a member of the nomenklatura he became a prosecutor in the new Soviet legal system, began a rivalry with a fellow lawyer, Nikolai Krylenko, and in 1925 was elected rector of Moscow University, which he began to clear of "unsuitable" students and professors.

In 1928, he presided over the Shakhty Trial against 53 alleged counter-revolutionary "wreckers". Krylenko acted as prosecutor, and the outcome was never in doubt. As historian Arkady Vaksberg explains, "all the court's attention was concentrated not on analyzing the evidence, which simply did not exist, but on securing from the accused confirmation of their confessions of guilt that were contained in the records of the preliminary investigation."

In 1930, he acted as co-prosecutor with Krylenko at another show trial, which was accompanied by a storm of propaganda. In this case, all eight defendants confessed their guilt. As a result, he was promoted.

He carried out administrative preparations for a "systematic" drive "against harvest-wreckers and grain-thieves".

Procurator General and Soviet law theorist

In 1935, he became Procurator General of the Soviet Union, the legal mastermind of Joseph Stalin's Great Purge. Although he acted as a judge, he encouraged investigators to procure confessions from the accused. In some cases, he prepared the indictments before the "investigation" was concluded. In his Theory of Judicial Proofs in Soviet Justice (Stalin Prize in 1947) he laid a theoretical base for the Soviet judicial system. He also used his own speeches from the Moscow Trials as an example of how defendants' statements could be used as primary evidence. Vyshinsky is cited for the principle that "confession of the accused is the queen of evidence".

Vyshinsky first became a nationally known public figure as a result of the Semenchuk case of 1936. Konstantin Semenchuk was the head of the Glavsevmorput station on Wrangel Island. He was accused of oppressing and starving the local Yupik and of ordering his subordinate, the sledge driver Stepan Startsev, to murder Dr. Nikolai Vulfson, who had attempted to stand up to Semenchuk, on 27 December 1934 (though there were also rumors that Startsev had fallen in love with Vulfson's wife, Dr. Gita Feldman, and killed him out of jealousy). The case came to trial before the Supreme Court of the RSFSR in May 1936; both defendants, attacked by Vyshinsky as "human waste", were found guilty and shot, and "the most publicised result of the trial was the joy of the liberated Eskimos."

In 1936, Vyshinsky achieved international infamy as the prosecutor at the Zinoviev-Kamenev trial (this trial had nine other defendants), the first of the Moscow Trials during the Great Purge, lashing its defenseless victims with vituperative rhetoric:

He often punctuated speeches with phrases like "Dogs of the Fascist bourgeoisie", "mad dogs of Trotskyism", "dregs of society", "decayed people", "terrorist thugs and degenerates", and "accursed vermin". This dehumanization aided in what historian Arkady Vaksberg calls "a hitherto unknown type of trial where there was not the slightest need for evidence: what evidence did you need when you were dealing with 'stinking carrion' and 'mad dogs'?"

He is also attributed by some as the author of an infamous quote from the Stalin era: "Give me a man and I will find the crime."

During the trials, Vyshinsky misappropriated the house and money of Leonid Serebryakov (one of the defendants of the infamous Moscow Trials), who was later executed. 

Roland Freisler, a German Nazi judge, who served as the State Secretary of the Reich Ministry of Justice, studied and had attended the trials by Vyshinsky's in 1938 to use a similar approach in show trials conducted by Nazi Germany.

Wartime diplomat
The Great Purge inflicted tremendous losses on the People's Commissariat of Foreign Affairs. Maxim Litvinov was one of the few diplomats who survived and he was dismissed. Vyshinsky had a low opinion of diplomats because they often complained about the effect of trials on opinions in the West.

In 1939, Vyshinsky entered another phase of his career when he introduced a motion to the Supreme Soviet to bring the Western Ukraine into the USSR. Afterwards, as deputy chairman of the People's Commissariat, which oversaw culture and education, as this area and others were incorporated more fully into the USSR, he directed efforts to convert the written alphabets of conquered peoples to the Cyrillic alphabet.

In June 1940 Vyshinsky was sent to Latvia to supervise the establishment of a pro-Soviet government and incorporation of that country into the USSR. He was generally well received, and he set out to purge the Latvian Communist Party of Trotskyists, Bukharinites, and possible foreign agents. In July 1940, a Latvian Soviet Republic was proclaimed. It was, unsurprisingly, granted admission to the USSR. As a result of this success, he was named Deputy People's Commissar of Foreign Affairs, and taken into greater confidence by Stalin, Lavrentiy Beria, and Vyacheslav Molotov.

After the German invasion of the Soviet Union Vyshinsky was transferred to the shadow capital at Kuibyshev. He remained here for much of the war, but he continued to act as a loyal functionary, and attempted to ingratiate himself with Archibald Clark Kerr and visiting Republican presidential candidate Wendell Willkie. During the Tehran Conference in 1943, he remained in the Soviet Union to "keep shop" while most of the leadership was abroad. Stalin appointed him to the Allied Control Council on Italian affairs where he began organizing the repatriation of Soviet POWs (including those who did not want to return to the Soviet Union). He also began to liaise with the Italian Communist Party in Naples.

In February 1945, he accompanied Stalin, Molotov, and Beria to the Yalta Conference. After returning to Moscow he was dispatched to Romania, where he arranged for a communist regime to assume control in 1945. He then once again accompanied the Soviet leadership to the Potsdam Conference.

British diplomat Sir Frank Roberts, who served as British chargé d'affaires in Moscow from February 1945 to October 1947, described him as follows:

Post-Second World War

He was responsible for the Soviet preparations for the trial of the major German war criminals by the International Military Tribunal.

In 1953, he was among the chief figures accused by the U.S. Congress Kersten Committee during its investigation of the Soviet occupation of the Baltic states.

The positions he held included those of vice-premier (1939–1944), Deputy Minister of Foreign Affairs (1940–1949), Minister of Foreign Affairs (1949–1953), academician of the Academy of Sciences of the Soviet Union from 1939, and permanent representative of the Soviet Union to the United Nations.

He died of heart attack on 22 November, 1954 while in New York on a working visit and his ashes buried at the Kremlin Wall Necropolis.

Scholarship
Vyshinsky was the director of the Academy of Sciences of the Soviet Union's Institute of State and Law. Until the period of de-Stalinization, the Institute of State and Law was named in his honor.

During his tenure as director of the ISL, Vyshinsky oversaw the publication of several important monographs on the general theory of state and law.

Family
Vyshinsky married Kapitolina Isidorovna Mikhailova and had a daughter named Zinaida Andreyevna Vyshinskaya (born 1909).

Awards and decorations
 Six Orders of Lenin (1937, 1943, 1945, 1947, 1954)
 Order of the Red Banner of Labour (1933)
 Medal "For the Defence of Moscow" (1944)
 Medal "For Valiant Labour in the Great Patriotic War 1941–1945" (1945).
 Stalin Prize, first class (1947; for the monograph "Theory of forensic evidence in Soviet law")

Cultural references
The Pet Shop Boys song "This Must Be the Place I Waited Years to Leave" from the album Behaviour (1990) contains a sample of recording from Vyshinsky's speech at the Zinoviev-Kamenev trial of 1936.

Vyshinsky appears at the beginning of the 2016 novel A Gentleman in Moscow by Amor Towles as the prosecutor in a purported transcript of an appearance by Count Alexander Ilyich Rostov, the novel's gentleman protagonist, before the Emergency Committee of the People's Commissariat for Internal Affairs on 21 June 1922.

In Gregor Martov's alternative history novel His New Majesty, depicting an alternate history in which Anton Denikin's White forces defeated the Bolsheviks in 1921, Vyshinsky joins the winners and acts as the royal prosecutor in a show trial in which Lenin, Stalin, Trotsky and Bukharin are sentenced to death as "Subversives, Traitors, Blasphemers and Regicides". He is rewarded in being ennobled by the restored czar and made a duke, but gets assassinated by an anarchist girl with whom he had a secret affair.

See also
 Foreign relations of the Soviet Union

References

External links

"The Soviet Legal Narrative" - An essay by Anna Lukina about Vyshinsky as a theorist and his influence on the Nuremberg Trials and international law
Andrei Yanuaryevich Vyshinsky, morning session, speech at the 1936 trial of Zinoviev and Kamenev
Venona transcript #1822
 

1883 births
1954 deaths
20th-century jurists
20th-century Russian politicians
Politicians from Odesa
People from Kherson Governorate
Central Executive Committee of the Soviet Union members
Permanent Representatives of the Soviet Union to the United Nations
Ambassador Extraordinary and Plenipotentiary (Soviet Union)
Politburo of the Central Committee of the Communist Party of the Soviet Union candidate members
Full Members of the USSR Academy of Sciences
Academic staff of Moscow State University
Academic staff of the Plekhanov Russian University of Economics
Rectors of Moscow State University
Russian Social Democratic Labour Party members
Bolsheviks
Mensheviks
Soviet Ministers of Foreign Affairs
First convocation members of the Soviet of the Union
Second convocation members of the Soviet of the Union
Fourth convocation members of the Soviet of the Union
Stalin Prize winners
Recipients of the Order of Lenin
Recipients of the Order of the Red Banner of Labour
Great Purge perpetrators
Trial of the Sixteen (Great Purge)
Lawyers from the Russian Empire
People from the Russian Empire of Polish descent
Soviet people of Polish descent
Ukrainian people of Polish descent
Russian prosecutors
Russian revolutionaries
Soviet lawyers
Burials at the Kremlin Wall Necropolis